Kaufman's, or Kaufman's Deli is a delicatessen in Skokie, Illinois in the United States. The deli opened in the 1960s as a hub for holocaust survivors, and is one of the Chicago area's oldest operating Jewish delis. The deli has been owned by the Dworkin family since 1984, and was rebuilt after a 2011 fire. Bagels at Kaufmans use caraway seeds, which is a Midwestern style.

References  

Restaurants in Chicago
Jewish delicatessens in the United States
Skokie, Illinois